Charles W. Woodward High School is a former U.S. high school located in North Bethesda, Maryland, near Rockville. The building housed a Tilden middle school until the COVID-19 pandemic and subsequent relocation of the school.

Etymology
In 1965, the Montgomery County Board of Education named the school after Judge Charles W. Woodward, Sr. (1895–1969), who served as Associate Judge and later as Chief Judge of the Sixth Judicial Circuit of Maryland from 1932 to 1955.

History and future

Charles W. Woodward High School opened in 1966. Two decades later, in 1987, its students were merged into Walter Johnson High School. Woodward and Walter Johnson High Schools had the same diminished enrollment levels, but MCPS decided to preserve Walter Johnson given the schools larger capacity and the resolution passed by the school's PTA in support of closing Woodward.

After a brief period as swing space while Springbrook High was being renovated, the building was used to house Tilden Middle School while that school's facility began a major renovation project. Tilden relocated to its new building during the summer of 2020. MCPS Superintendent Jack Smith's 2020 Capital Budget includes the funding for the reopening of Woodward High School in 2022. The budget has options for Woodward to function for two school years,  starting in September 2023, as a holding school for Northwood High School, as the latter facility undergoes a planned expansion, or instead implement a phased construction for Northwood, with it remaining onsite at its current facility, thereby allowing Woodward to function as its own individual school. Demolition of the old building commenced at the end of February, 2021.

In 2018, then County Council President Hans Riemer and then Montgomery County first lady Catherine Leggett led an effort to rename Charles W. Woodward High School in honor of the Rev. Josiah Henson, who served as the inspiration for the anti-slavery novel Uncle Tom's Cabin, when the school reopens in 2022.

Notable alumni
 Scott Cook — professional soccer player
 Michael Davis — producer, director, and writer
 Steve Sands — Sports broadcaster
 Michael Mayer — director
 Lisa Nowak — astronaut
 Daniel Snyder — owner of the Washington Football Team
 Brian Transeau – electronic musician

References

External links

Defunct schools in Maryland
Public schools in Montgomery County, Maryland
Educational institutions established in 1966
1966 establishments in Maryland
North Bethesda, Maryland